Operational planning (OP) is the process of implementing strategic plans and objectives to reach specific goals. An operational plan describes the specific steps in any given strategic planning model and explains how and what portion of resources will be put into operation during a given operational period: in the case of commercial application or a government budget balance, a fiscal year. An operational plan is the basis for and justification of an annual operating budget needed to achieve an overall strategic plan.

An operational plan draws from the strategic plans to describe program missions and goals, program objectives, and program activities. While an operational plan may differ depending on the sector, the core components of an operational plan includes benchmarking and determining how progress is measured.

The operations plan is both the first and the last step in preparing an operating budget request. As the first step, the operations plan provides a plan for resource allocation; as the last step, the OP may be modified to reflect policy decisions or financial changes made during the budget development process.

Operational plans are generally prepared by the people who will be involved in implementation. There is often a need for cross-departmental dialogue as plans created by one part of the organization inevitably have implications for other parts.

Operational plans should contain:

Identifying clear objectives to be achieved
Details that are aligned with the strategic plan
Ensuring staffing and resource requirements  
Performance management

See also
 Integrated business planning
 Government Performance and Results Act

References

Business planning
Business terms
Business process